ELTA Systems Ltd (ELTA) is an Israeli provider of defense products and services specializing in radar, ELINT, COMINT, C4ISTAR, Electronic Warfare, Communication, Autonomous Ground Systems, Intelligence and Cyber products.

ELTA, a group and subsidiary of Israel Aerospace Industries, is one of Israel's major defence electronics companies specializing in a variety of fields. The company was established in 1967 and moved to Ashdod as part of Levi Eshkol's policy of industry decentralization. The group operates as a designer and manufacture of defense systems house with products based on electromagnetic sensors (radar, electronic warfare and communication) and on other advanced technologies.

ELTA products are designed for use in Intelligence, surveillance, target acquisition, and reconnaissance (ISTAR), early warning & control, homeland security (HLS), self-protection and self-defense, fire control and Cyber Defense . ELTA operates a worldwide marketing network, which includes customer service and after-sales facilities. Although organized internally  into groups by application, there is considerable re-use of common technology .

Divisions 

   

Air Defense & Naval Systems

ELTA is Israel's leading radar house and a design, development and production center for advanced systems based on radar sensors and technologies. The division's systems are designed for imagery intelligence, surveillance and reconnaissance, air-defense, self-defense, target acquisition and fire control applications. ELTA's IMINT & radar division also has ground and coastal border protection systems; systems for protecting international border crossings (airports, harbors, roads and railways); commercial aircraft self-protection Systems; SIGINT information gathering systems focusing on terror infrastructures and urban emergency centers.
group webpages

SIGINT, EW & Communication Division

Design, development and production center for advanced SIGINT, EW and communication systems based on electromagnetic sensors. ELTA SIGINT, EW & communication division systems are designed for signal intelligence (SIGINT - ELINT & COMINT), self-defense, electronic warfare and communication applications, and include advanced data links and SATCOM.

Land Systems
homeland defences

Airborne Systems & Radars Division

ELTA Airborne Systems & Radars division is a system house for design, development, integration and management of airborne early warning and control (AEW&C) programs and airborne RADAR systems.

Science and Technology Division

The ELTA technologies division develops technologies, providing ELTA systems with independent capabilities to manufacture critical super components and subsystems for various applications, such as miniaturized microwave modules, antennas, transmitters, signal processors, etc., as well as special automatic test equipment. In addition, this division constitutes the manufacture, procurement, and logistic center of the ELTA systems group.

Microwave Division

Deals with various microwave transmission applications.

Sales and backlog
Sales in 2020 reached over $1,500 million, of which close to 85% was exported to the armed forces of over 30 countries worldwide and 15% was sold domestically, where ELTA is major supplier to the IDF. ELTA has exported its products to over 70 countries worldwide.

Business development
The group has holdings in subsidiaries/affiliated companies located in Israel, Europe and South America, North America, Asia and more. ELTA Systems is often a partner in teaming agreements with numerous other defense companies around the world. ELTA is also active in paramilitary and commercial markets.

References

Defense companies of Israel
Israel Aerospace Industries
Ashdod
Radar manufacturers